Heterops is a genus of beetles in the family Cerambycidae, containing the following species:

 Heterops bicolor Fisher, 1936
 Heterops bipartitus Lacordaire, 1869
 Heterops cubaecola Fisher, 1947
 Heterops dimidiatus (Chevrolat, 1838)
 Heterops duvali Fisher, 1947
 Heterops hispaniolae Fisher, 1932
 Heterops lanieri (Chevrolat, 1838)
 Heterops loreyi (Duponchel, 1837)
 Heterops robusta Cazier & Lacey, 1952

References

Heteropsini